Dusit Thani College (DTC) (Thai: วิทยาลัยดุสิตธานี) is a private institute in Bangkok, Thailand specializing in hospitality and culinary arts management.

History 
In 1993 Dusit Thani College was established as 'The Dusit Thani Hotel School', an addition to the Dusit Thani Group, which owns and operates hotels and resorts. The college is adjacent to one of the group's hotels.

At that time, Thailand had a shortage of manpower, knowledge and experience in the hospitality industry, due in part to a lack of educational institutes and training programmes. Those that existed focused only on theory, offering no practical experience for the students. In addition, there were few industry leaders involved in the academic development of hotel businesses.

Dusit Thani Hotel School was established to meet this need by delivering specialised, practical training for the industry and to support Thailand's developing hotel business.

At first, two courses were available:

 Diploma in Hotel Operations

 Professional Chef Diploma
Dusit Thani Hotel School became the first institute in Thailand to be approved for college status and started to offer undergraduate programs.

Programs 
Dusit Thani College offer undergraduate and postgraduate level.

Undergraduate Thai Program: 3 bachelor's degree programs:

 Hotel Management
 Service Innovation in Tourism Industry
 Culinary Arts and Restaurant Management

Undergraduate International Program: 2 bachelor's degree programs:

 Hotel and Resort Management, academic certification by École hôtelière de Lausanne
 Professional Culinary Arts, a jointly degree between Le Cordon Bleu And Dusit Thani College

Postgraduate Thai Program : 2 master's degree program:

 Master of Business Administration (Hospitality Business Management)
Master of Business Administration (Innovative Entrepreneur)

Campuses 
Currently, There are 2 campuses. 

 Dusit Thani College, Bangkok Campus
 Dusit Thani College, Pattaya City Center

External links
Dusit Thani College

Universities and colleges in Bangkok
Educational institutions established in 1993
1993 establishments in Thailand
Colleges in Thailand
Dusit International